Redondo Beach Unified School District is a school district with approximately 10,000 students headquartered in Redondo Beach, California.  The school district consists of eight elementary schools, two middle schools, one high school, one continuation school, and one adult school.

RBUSD serves the city of Redondo Beach. In addition, residents of Hermosa Beach may choose to attend Redondo Union High School of RBUSD or the Mira Costa High School of the Manhattan Beach Unified School District.

History
RBUSD was established in 1993 by the consolidation of Redondo Beach City School District and the South Bay Union High School District, which covered Redondo Beach and two other municipalities. Residents of the latter voted to dissolve it in 1992.

Superintendent
 Dr. Nicole Wesley

Assistant Superintendents
 Dr. Susan Wildes, Assistant Superintendent, Educational Services
 Lisa Veal, Executive Director, Educational Services
 Nicole Wesley, Assistant Superintendent, Human Resources
 Annette Alpern,  Deputy Superintendent, Administrative Services
 Jessica Silberling, Executive Director, Special Education
 Susana Garcia, Chief Technology Officer, Information Technology

Board of Education
 Brad Serkin: Board President
 Raymur Flinn: Board Vice President
 Michael Christensen: Board Presiding Officer
 Brad Waller: Board Member
 David Witkin: Board Member
 Charles Steerman: Student Board Member

Elections are held at the same time as the Redondo Beach City Council elections on the first Tuesday after the first Monday in March of odd-numbered years.

Schools

High schools
 Redondo Union High School
 Patricia Dreizler Continuation High School

Middle schools
 Adams Middle School
 Parras Middle School

Primary school
 Alta Vista Elementary School
 Beryl Heights Elementary School
 Birney Elementary School
 Jefferson Elementary School
 Lincoln Elementary School
 Madison Elementary School
 Tulita Elementary School
 Washington Elementary School

Alternative Education
 RBUSD Independent Study
 RBUSD Learning Academy

Adult Education
 South Bay Adult School

Child Development Centers
 Child Development Centers - CDC

References

External links
  Redondo Beach Unified School District

School districts in Los Angeles County, California
School districts established in 1993
Redondo Beach, California
1993 establishments in California